Shane Connor (born 3 April 1959) also billed/credited as Shane Feeney-Connor, is an Australian actor, who has had extensive experience in stage, television and film productions, both locally and internationally in the United Kingdom and United States.

Connor is probably best known for his role in TV serial Neighbours as patriarch Joe Scully

Connor has appeared in the Network Ten TV series Prisoner as well as its re-imagining series Wentworth on Foxtel.

Early life
Connor was born in Woodville, South Australia in April 1959 and graduated from University of Melbourne drama division the Victorian College of the Arts in the early 1980s. He worked steadily in film, theatre and television for many years.

Career
Connor's television credits include the Channel Seven series Fire, the Australian Broadcasting Corporation drama Heartland, the miniseries The Harp in the South and Poor Man's Orange and Halifax f.p. (1998). He appeared in the USA television network miniseries Moby Dick as Flask.

Connor also played guest roles in Australian soap operas: He played a guest role of Kevin, husband of Cheryll (Lisa Aldenhoven), in the women's prison drama serial Prisoner. Then in 1986 he returned to the series in the recurring role of biker Bongo Connors. Connor had a brief role as another biker, Angel, in Sons and Daughters in 1986.

Awards include the 1984 Penguin Award for best actor, 1995 Green Room Award for outstanding fringe performer and a nomination for the 1998 AFI Award for best actor in a leading role in a television drama (Halifax f.p.).

Neighbours
In July 1999, Connor joined the  cast of Neighbours and began filming the ongoing role Joe Scully of builder and family patriarch, with his first scene's going on air in October. The show's producers invited him to audition for the role, and he decided to accept when he found out that he would be working with actress Janet Andrewartha, who plays Joe's on-screen wife Lyn Scully. Connor had previously played a guest role in the series as character Phil Hoffman debuting on-screen in "Episode 1410" on 26 March and appearing until 16 April 1991. Joe Scully gave Connor the chance to play a character who was not a "bad guy, a confrontational type, a man on the verge". Connor was initially contracted with Neighbours for three years, with 12-month renewal options.

Connor was fired from the series in September 2003, several months after receiving a written warning from producers and overcoming an amphetamine habit. There had been ongoing hostility between him and Andrewartha; who had been the source of the vast majority of complaints about him. He sued the show's producer, Grundy Television, for wrongful termination of his contract, seeking about $200,000.

The court hearing heard that he had an amphetamine drug habit while performing on the show. Connor's older brother died in June 2001 and he had been badly affected by this, leading to the drug habit. Members of the cast and crew had complained about his behaviour at work. This included alleged aggressive behaviour and lateness that delayed production. After being confronted about his problem he met with the cast in May 2003 and admitted the problem and apologised.

Connor won the case and was awarded by the Supreme Court of Victoria over $230,000 in libel damages.

After Neighbours
Connor worked in the United Kingdom in pantomime. He also appeared as a guest in reality TV show The Salon. He also appeared in Killing Time.

He later guested in Nine Network's House Husbands. Connor joined the cast of Wentworth in a recurring role in 2018.

Filmography

References

External links
 
 Connor v Grundy Television Pty Ltd 2005 VSC 466

Australian male film actors
Australian male soap opera actors
Living people
1959 births
20th-century Australian male actors
21st-century Australian male actors
Male actors from Adelaide